J. Craig Thorpe (born 1948) is a modern American commercial and landscape artist.  Much of his work depicts trains and the rail transport industry in the Western United States and Alaska.  He has advocated greater use of rail transport, especially in contrast with automobiles, and has served as a director of the rail advocacy group All Aboard Washington.  Thorpe was commissioned to paint an image celebrating the 2006 centennial of King Street Station in Seattle, Washington.

See also
Trains in art

References

External links
Official website

American landscape painters
20th-century American painters
American male painters
21st-century American painters
1948 births
Living people
Painters from Washington (state)
20th-century American male artists